In the field of book publishing, a collection or, more precisely, editorial collection, is a set of books published by the same publisher, usually written by various authors, each book with its own title, but all grouped under the same collective title. The collective title is the title of the collection, it must be mentioned on each book.

The books that make up an editorial collection can be published in a specific order or not. When each volume in the collection has a serial number, it is called a numbered collection.

A collection generally using distinctive, common formats and features. The title of a collection can be accompanied by the term "series" or its equivalents in other languages, such as in the English-speaking world, for example, the "Bibliothèque de la Pléiade", "Découvertes Gallimard" and "Que sais-je?" are all termed "book series" instead of collections. Conversely, Thames & Hudson's "World of Art" series was published as a collection in France and Spain.

Brief history 

In France, the concept of "collection" was invented by Louis Hachette, a 19th-century publisher, under the name , which means "library".

In 19th and early 20th-century Spain, literary collection publishings such as "", "", "" and "" were in full swing. The "Biblioteca ilustrada de Gaspar y Roig", created in 1851 in Madrid, notably for its encyclopaedialike contents. It contains not only the literary works (popular novels of the 19th century), but also reference work (dictionary), Comte de Buffon's Histoire Naturelle, Cesare Cantù's , Juan de Mariana's ... and it even contains the whole Bible in Spanish.

In Italy, the first editorial collection was the "Collana historica" (or "Collana historica de' Greci"), which included vulgarised works of twelve Greek historians, edited by the 16th-century humanist Tommaso Porcacchi and printed in Venice by Gabriele Giolito de' Ferrari from 1563 to 1585.

In Portugal, the ""—a collection of science fiction novels and short stories—appeared in 1953, created by the Portuguese publisher , which aimed to be a pioneer in the popularization of the genre in the country.

In Brazil, the "boom of collections" took place in a context of impressive growth of the publishing market. If the publication of collections was still thin on the ground in the 1920s, it would eventually rise and spread in the 30s.

In Romania, the "Biblioteca pentru toți", a pocket-sized collection, was created by the folklorist  in 1895.

Definition 

A collection is characterized by having uniformity in the presentation, as well as by a certain affinity in the contents. The use of the same dimension for each book, the same type of cover, and also the same type of spine. In this regard, sometimes the same colours are used on the cover (in the case of the publishers Dalloz and ), and sometimes different colours or details are always systematically used (collection "Bibliothèques" of the Éditions du ). Generally, the grammage of paper for each collection is always the same, as well as the typography applied, the cover design and page layout (collection "Découvertes Gallimard"). Certain collections even get to fix the number of pages, for example, the books in the collection "Que sais-je?" always have 128 pages. A collection can be further subdivided into several series or sub-collections, for example, the collection "Découvertes Gallimard" contains seven series as well as several sub-collections.

The volumes of a collection are also characterized by a defined content or style. Thus, a literary collection will have, for example, novels in their original language, translated works, works with literary value of national authors, or regroup texts of a certain subject or a certain genre, et cetera. In terms of reference works, there are collections of school or university textbooks, collections of research works and of practical books. Some collections are distinguished by a very strong orientation towards specialisation, such as collections on the study of Egyptology, on jurisprudence, on pharmacy, astronomy... others inversely by an encyclopaedic tendency (in the case of "Découvertes Gallimard"). Some collections include both literary texts and reference texts, such as "Le Livre de Poche", others are specialised in classic books.

Undoubtedly, a publication in a collection format has its importance in terms of marketing. Given that a collection is characterized by a visual unity, with successive editions and with the help of promotion, it can even lead to a degree of fidelity of the public, which obviously supports the commercial success. In many publishing houses, the tasks of selection of works and programming in general fall under the orbit of the "director of collection".

Certain collections have had such fame, that sometimes they are considered or can be considered almost as independent publishing houses, such is the case with the "Bibliothèque de la Pléiade" edited by Éditions Gallimard.

Collection and series 

Although the two are similar in many ways, editorial collection and book series differ because books in a collection do not necessarily have a specific order, or a common subject, but with a certain affinity in the content of books (collections on art, on religion, on science...), as well as in the format, spine and layout, even grammage, number of pages and style of typeface. A collection can include one or more sub-collections or series (as in the case of 's "Biblioteca Básica de Historia", and Gallimard's "Découvertes"). A publisher mainly creates a collection according to its editorial line or for commercial reasons. While books in a series generally have a common subject, character, or universe, in other words, it's a set of volumes that are related to each other by certain thematic element, and volumes may or may not have a specific order within a series. A series can also include one or more sub-series.

See also 

 Serial (publishing)
 Monographic series
 Books in Brazil
 Books in France
 Books in Italy
 Books in Spain

References